The women's 1500 metres event at the 2015 Asian Athletics Championships was held on the 3 of June.

Results

References

1500
1500 metres at the Asian Athletics Championships
2015 in women's athletics